Abdulhafis Nibu (born 2 October 1991), is a Thai professional footballer who plays as a defender for Thai League 3 club Songkhla.

Personal life
Abdulhafis was born in Songkhla, Southern Thailand on 2 October 1991 to a Thai Malay family.

Club career

Hat Yai
In 2016 Abdulhafis joined Hat Yai on a 1 year contract and got another extension until 2018.

Hat Yai City
Abdulhafis joined Hat Yai City in 2019.

Songkhla
Abdulhafis joined Songkhla in 2020. At that time Songkhla was playing in Thai League 4 South zone.

References

External links

1991 births
Living people
Association football defenders
Abdulhafis Nibu
Abdulhafis Nibu
Abdulhafis Nibu
Abdulhafis Nibu